Constrictotermes cavifrons is a species of Amazonian nasute termite within the genus Constrictotermes. It forms large and diurnal open-foraging trails to and from its sources of food which consists largely of lichens and other microepiphytes. The nests of C. cavifrons are arboreal and characterized by a cleared central runway from which foraging raids begin.

Description

The soldiers have antennae with 13 – 14 articles (antennomeres) and the length of the head ranges between 1.25 – 1.50 mm. The head and abdomen segments are pigmented dark in contrast to the conspicuously yellowish thorax, matching the coloration of workers. Soldiers of this species molt from sclerotized worker-like forms which are slightly smaller than the actual  workers but otherwise appear to behave no differently. The head of the pre-soldier form measures between 0.839 – 0.887 mm while workers range between 0.936 – 1.036 mm. The slit-shaped fontanelle of the pre-soldier form is also larger and more defined. During the molt the third and fourth antenna segments fuse and all antenna segments post-molt are more elongated than in the pre-soldier worker-like form.

The imago of this species has a brownish-black, broadly oval head capsule which is sparsely covered by long hair. The fontanelle is slit-shaped and forks at the tip. The antennae consists of 15 segments with the second article equal in length to the fourth; third article is more than double the length of the 2nd article. Eyes and ocelli are large and the postclypeus is black-brown with no distinct median line. The wings are a dark smokey color and the venation is conspicuous. Length with wings included is 17 – 19 mm, body length excluding wings is between 8 – 10 mm.

Nest 

The nests are arboreal and typically found 10 meters high on a host tree. Unlike the nests of other arboreal species which have dark colored nests indicative of significant lignocellulose content, the nests of C. cavifrons are light in color which indicates a high amount of mineral soil used in their construction. Nests are mainly characterized by their elongate shape that tapers into a central runway which is either flanked by gallery walls on both sides and/or by downward sloping narrow ridges. These narrow ridges are perhaps the most diagnostic feature of the nests, and are believed to help divert rainfall from the central runway.

References 

Insects described in 1910
Termites